Litoreibacter arenae is a Gram-negative, and short rod-shaped bacterium from the genus of Litoreibacter which has been isolated from sand from the Homi Cape in Korea.

References 

Rhodobacteraceae
Bacteria described in 2009